is a Japanese politician. He was a member of the Japan Restoration Association (JRA), and a member of the House of Representatives in the Diet (national legislature). On October 3, 2012, he was selected as the parliamentary leader of the JRA and held this position until the party dissolved in September 2014. He is the member for the Kumamoto No. 1 seat and has been elected four times.

Background and early career
A native of Kamoto District, Kumamoto and graduate of Keio University, he was a staff member at the headquarters of the Japan New Party, and secretary to former Prime Minister Morihiro Hosokawa. Subsequently, he worked at the New Frontier Party headquarters.

He was elected to the House of Representatives for the first time in 2000 after an unsuccessful run in 1998. Matsuno served as Deputy Chief Cabinet Secretary during the 2009-2010 Democratic Party of Japan (DPJ) administration of Prime Minister Yukio Hatoyama. Matsuno was a member of the Hatoyama group within the DPJ.

Move to Japan Restoration Association
On September 11, 2012, Matsuno submitted his resignation to the DPJ and joined Tōru Hashimoto's new national political party, the Japan Restoration Association, Nippon Isshin no Kai. He became one of seven initial lawmakers from the DPJ, Liberal Democratic Party, and Your Party to join the new party.

The first meeting of the nine JRA lawmakers was held on October 3, 2012. Matsuno was selected as the leader of the nine lawmakers.

References

External links 
  in Japanese.

Members of the House of Representatives (Japan)
Keio University alumni
People from Kumamoto Prefecture
Living people
1960 births
Democratic Party of Japan politicians
Japan Restoration Party politicians
21st-century Japanese politicians